Haeata Community Campus is a school in the suburb of Wainoni, in Christchurch New Zealand. It opened on 3 February 2017 with an initial roll of 955 from the closure of four schools: Aranui Primary, Avondale Primary, Wainoni School, and Aranui High. The principal is Peggy Burrows.

Principals
Since its opening in 2017, Haeata Community Campus has been led by the following principals:

2017–2019: Andy Kai Fong
2020–present: Peggy Burrows

References

External links
Official website

Secondary schools in Christchurch
Educational institutions established in 2017
2017 establishments in New Zealand